Iran has rapid transit systems operating in five cities, and others are under construction.

Currently operational

As of 16 November 2015, the following metro systems were operational in Iran.
 Tehran Metro
 Mashhad Urban Railway
 Shiraz Metro
 Isfahan Metro 
 Tabriz Metro
 Karaj Metro

Under construction
Along with extension work on the Tehran Metro and Mashhad urban rail, three other metro projects are being built. In total, 172 extra kilometers were to be built by 2012 and over 380 kilometers in the other cities.
 Other cities with plans to construct a metro:
 Ahvaz Metro
 Kermanshah Metro
 Qom Metro (along with a Monorail Line known as Qom Monorail)
 Kerman Metro
 also Tram Projects are Proposed in Many cities include: 
 Tehran LRT
 Tabriz Tramway
 Shiraz Tram System
 Urmia Tramway
 Rasht Tramway
 Kerman Tramway
 Hamadan Tramway
 Qazvin Tramway
 Kish Tramway

See also
 List of tram and light-rail transit systems
 List of bus rapid transit systems
 List of rapid transit systems

References

External links

 
Public transport in Iran